Miss Uganda or Miss Uganda World is a national Beauty pageant in Uganda.

History
The Miss Uganda pageant started in 1967, with the winner always participating at the Miss World pageant, though having only one Miss Uganda reaching the finals since its inception. The Ministry of Agriculture directs the Miss Uganda with the stated purpose of increasing the interest of young people in agriculture.

In 2014, Salim Saleh publicly announced collaboration between the Miss Uganda Foundation, the organizers of the annual contest, and the Wealth Creation program that Saleh heads. "We are almost signing a Memorandum of Understanding with the Miss Uganda Foundation because we want to choose the next Miss Uganda basing on agriculture and this is intended to interest the young people into the sector," Saleh said.

Titleholders
 
Miss Uganda World has started to send a Winner to Miss World since 1967. On occasion, when the winner does not qualify (due to age) for either contest, a runner-up is sent.

References

External links
Miss World: Uganda

1967 establishments in Uganda
Beauty pageants in Uganda
Uganda
Recurring events established in 1967
Ugandan awards